Kilsyth South is a suburb of Melbourne, Victoria, Australia, 30 km east from Melbourne's Central Business District, located within the City of Maroondah local government area. Kilsyth South recorded a population of 2,862 at the 2021 census.

The bushland of the suburb is the only place where the Kilsyth South Spider Orchid is found.

See also
 Shire of Lillydale – Kilsyth South was previously within this former local government area.
 Population of Kilsyth South

References

Suburbs of Melbourne
Suburbs of the City of Maroondah